No Doubt is a Grammy Award-winning third wave ska band from Anaheim, California. No Doubt has released five studio albums: No Doubt (1992), The Beacon Street Collection  (1995), Tragic Kingdom (1995), Return of Saturn (2000), and Rock Steady (2001) and Push and Shove (2012). All of the band's albums have been released with the Interscope Records record label.

The band's best-selling album, Tragic Kingdom, sold 16 million copies worldwide and peaked at #1 on the Billboard 200, Canadian, Finnish, Norwegian, and New Zealand charts. The album was also certified Diamond in the United States and Canada, three-times Platinum in Australia, and Platinum in the United Kingdom. "Hey Baby", a single from No Doubt's fifth studio album, Rock Steady, received the award for "Best Pop Performance by a Duo or Group with Vocal" from the Grammy Awards, and the awards for both "Best Group Video" and "Best Pop Video" from the MTV Video Music Awards. Overall, No Doubt has received 13 awards from 43 nominations.

Grammy Awards

MTV Video Music Awards

|-
| rowspan=2|  ||rowspan=2| "Don't Speak" || Video of the Year || 
|-
| Best Group Video || 
|-
| rowspan=2|  ||rowspan=2| "Hey Baby" || Best Group Video || 
|-
| Best Pop Video || 
|-
| rowspan=2|  ||rowspan=2| "Underneath It All" || Best Pop Video || 
|-
| Best Cinematography || 
|-
| rowspan="5"|  ||rowspan="5"| "It's My Life" || Best Group Video || 
|-
| Best Pop Video || 
|-
| Best Direction || 
|-
| Best Art Direction || 
|-
| Best Cinematography ||

MTV Europe Music Awards

|-
| rowspan="2"| 1997 || No Doubt || Best New Act || 
|-
|Don't Speak || Best Song  || 
|-
| rowspan="2"| 2002 || No Doubt || Best Group || 
|-
|Rock Steady || Best Album || 
|-
| rowspan="1"| 2012 || No Doubt || Best Pop || 
|-
| rowspan="1"| 2013 || No Doubt || World Stage Performance||

MVPA Awards

|-
|1998
|Live in the Tragic Kingdom
|Longform Video of the Year 
|

Peoples Choice Awards

|-
| 2013 || No Doubt || Favorite Band || 
|-

ASCAP Pop Music Awards

|-
| 1999
| "Don't Speak"
| rowspan=2|Most Performed Songs
| 
|-
| 2004
| "Underneath It All"
| 
|-

American Music Award

|-
| 1997 || No Doubt || Favorite Pop/Rock New Artist ||

BDSCertified Spins Awards

|-
| 2002
| "Hey Baby"
| 200,000 Spins 
| 
|-
| 2006
| "It's My Life"
| 400,000 Spins 
|

BMI Pop Awards

|-
| rowspan=2|1996
| "Don't Speak"
| rowspan=2|Award-Winning Song
| 
|-
| "Spiderwebs"
|

Billboard Music Video Award

|-
| 2000 ||"Simple Kind of Life" || FAN.tastic Video ||

Danish Music Awards

|-
|1998
| "Don't Speak"
| Best International Hit
|

VH1/Vogue Fashion Award

|-
|rowspan="1"| 1999 ||rowspan="1"| "New" || Most Styling Video || 
|-
|-
|rowspan="2"| 2000 ||rowspan="1"| "Ex-Girlfriend" || Most Styling Video || 
|-
| No Doubt || Most Stylish Band  ||

Teen Choice Awards

|-
| rowspan="3"| 2003 || No Doubt || Choice Music: Rock Group || 
|-
|"Underneath It All" || Choice Music: Single || 
|-
|"Running" || Choice Music: Love Song || 
|-
| rowspan="2"| 2004 || "It's My Life" || Choice Music: Rock Track ||  
|-
| Singles Tour || Choice Music: Tour ||

BRIT Awards

|-
| rowspan="2"| 1998
| rowspan="2"| No Doubt
| Best International Newcomer
| 
|-
| Best International Group
|

International Dance Music Awards

|-
|| 2003 || "It's My Life"  || Best Alternative Rock Dance ||

Nickelodeon Kids' Choice Awards

|-
|| 2003 || No Doubt  ||  Favorite Band  ||

Viva Comet Awards

|-
| 2002
| "Hey Baby"
| Best International Video 
|

Žebřík Music Awards

!Ref.
|-
| 1997
| No Doubt 
| Best International Surprise
| 
|

References

External links
 

Awards
Lists of awards received by American musician
Lists of awards received by musical group